Harold Ridley may refer to:

Harold Ridley (ophthalmologist) (1906–2001), English ophthalmologist
Harold Ridley (Jesuit) (1939–2005), college president